Illegal Alien or Illegal Aliens may refer to:
  Alien (law), legal concept of aliens
 Illegal alien, the statutory and legal term used in some countries for an illegal immigrant or other unauthorized resident
 Illegal aliens (Library of Congress Subject Heading), a cause of controversy in 2016 
Enemy alien

Entertainment
 Illegal Aliens (film), a 2007 film starring Anna Nicole Smith and Chyna
 Illegal Aliens (novel), a 1989 science fiction novel by Nick Pollotta and Phil Foglio
 Illegal Alien (Sawyer novel), a 1997 science fiction novel by Robert J. Sawyer
 Illegal Alien (Tucker and Perry novel), a 1997 Doctor Who novel by Mike Tucker & Robert Perry
 Illegal Alien, a graphic novel by James Robinson
 "Illegal Alien" (song), a track on the album Genesis by Genesis (1983)